Jessica Scott Kerrin is a Canadian children's writer who is best known for her fiction books for young readers.

Early life and education

Kerrin was born and raised in Alberta, where she completed a degree in political science and psychology at the University of Calgary. She then studied at the Nova Scotia College of Art and Design. Upon graduation with a fine arts degree in 1988, she later completed a graduate degree in public administration from Dalhousie University.

Career
Kerrin remained in Halifax after graduation, and has written a number of children's books including Martin Bridge, a best-selling eight-book series of short stories; a trilogy called The Lobster Chronicles; two mystery novels inspired by the Old Burying Ground called The Spotted Dog Last Seen and The Missing Dog is Spotted; a travel adventure called "The Things Owen Wrote"; and a picture book called "The Better Tree Fort."

Kerrin primarily includes Atlantic east coast characters and settings in her work. Her books have been translated into French, Russian, Swedish, Turkish and Croatian.

Bibliography
Clear Skies
The Better Tree Fort
The Things Owen Wrote
The Missing Dog is Spotted
The Spotted Dog Last Seen
Spit Feathers: The Lobster Chronicles
A Narrow Escape: The Lobster Chronicles
Lower the Trap: The Lobster Chronicles 
Martin Bridge: Onwards and Upwards
Martin Bridge: The Sky's the Limit
Martin Bridge: In High Gear
Martin Bridge: Out of Orbit
Martin Bridge: Sound the Alarm
Martin Bridge: Blazing Ahead
Martin Bridge: On the Lookout
Martin Bridge: Ready for Takeoff

Reception
Lower the Trap: The Lobster Chronicles Kirkus saw "A cast of colorful characters and a satisfying ending will leave readers wondering whose story is next." while Jamais Jochim of Portland Book Review stated that "Although the use of scientific names for a number of species is acceptable given Graeme’s interests in biology, at times it weighs down the text." but concluded that "Judging by the first entry in the series, it looks like The Lobster Chronicle will be a fun trilogy."  The Toronto Star found "School social relations and an accessible plot combine with regional issues in this story..."

Recognition
Shortlisted for the 2014 Book of the Year for Children Award by the Canadian Library Association
Best Books of Exceptional Caliber, Canadian Children's Book Centre
Top Books List, New York City Public Library 
Best Book List, Horn Book Magazine 
Notable Book List, American Library Association

References

Further reading

Marylynn Miller Oke, Inspiration from the Edges, ''Canadian Children's Booknews, Summer, 2017, pages 16–19.

External links

Writers' Union of Canada
Canadian Children's Book Centre
Writers' Federation of Nova Scotia
website for Jessica Scott Kerrin

Year of birth missing (living people)
Living people
Canadian women children's writers
University of Calgary alumni
Dalhousie University alumni
NSCAD University alumni